An England cricket team toured Australia and New Zealand in the 1863–64 season. This was the second tour of Australia by an English team, the first having been in 1861–62, and the first to visit New Zealand. Like the 1859 team in North America, this team is sometimes referred to as George Parr's XI.

Squad
The team was captained by George Parr (Nottinghamshire) who was joined by William Caffyn, Julius Caesar, Tom Lockyer, (all Surrey); Alfred Clarke, Cris Tinley, John Jackson (all Nottinghamshire); George Tarrant, Robert Carpenter, Thomas Hayward (all Cambridgeshire); George Anderson (Yorkshire); and E. M. Grace (amateur; West Gloucestershire CC). Grace was the sole amateur in the party, all the other players being professionals.

Tour

The first match started on 1 January 1864 at the Melbourne Cricket Ground and the last ended on 24 April, also at the MCG. Parr's team played 14 matches in Victoria and New South Wales but only one is recognised as a first-class fixture. They also played five matches in the South Island of New Zealand during February.

The first-class match was held at the MCG in March. The two teams combined the tourists and local players on each side: in a close match G. Anderson's XI beat G. Parr's XI by four wickets.

References

Further reading
 Derek Birley, A Social History of English Cricket, Aurum, 1999
 Chris Harte, A History of Australian Cricket, Andre Deutsch, 1993

External links
 "The Old England Eleven in Australia" in Bell's Life in Victoria and Sporting Chronicle, 30 April 1864

1864 in Australian cricket
1864 in English cricket
1864 in New Zealand cricket
1863
1864
1864
International cricket competitions from 1844 to 1888
New Zealand cricket seasons from 1863–64 to 1889–90